Cihan Kaan Kaptan (born 4 March 1989, in Wuppertal) is a German retired footballer.

Career
Kaptan began his career by the Bambinis of Wuppertaler SV Borussia and signed 1996 a contract for D-Youth from Bayer 04 Leverkusen. With Bayer 04 Leverkusen he won the German A-youth Championship in 2007 (2–1 win in the final against Bayern Munich) and the youth A-German Cup in 2008 (3–1 in the final against Borussia Moenchengladbach). Kaptan won in his youth in twice the West German championship in 2007 and 2008. After twelve years at Bayer 04 Leverkusen he moved to the Süper Lig club Bursaspor. After only two Turkish Cup games in one and a half years at Bursaspor he joined in January 2010 Borussia Dortmund II, where he earned his first professional game on 7 February 2010 against Kickers Offenbach in the 3. Liga.

International career
He earned his first international cap for the Germany national youth football team against Turkey Under-20 football team in Kuşadası. Kaptan played as midfielder for the Germany national under-20 football team by the 2009 FIFA U-20 World Cup.

References

External links 
 
 

1989 births
Living people
Sportspeople from Wuppertal
German people of Turkish descent
German footballers
Germany youth international footballers
Association football midfielders
3. Liga players
Wuppertaler SV players
Bayer 04 Leverkusen players
Bursaspor footballers
Borussia Dortmund II players
Footballers from North Rhine-Westphalia
SSV Jahn Regensburg II players